Amer Sports Too is a Volvo Ocean 60 yacht. It was notable as the only all-female crew in the race, and was given special permission to sail with an extra crew member. She finished eighth in the 2001–02 Volvo Ocean Race skippered by Lisa McDonald.

References

Volvo Ocean Race yachts
Volvo Ocean 60 yachts
2000s sailing yachts